Kastellaun is a town in the Rhein-Hunsrück-Kreis (district) in Rhineland-Palatinate, Germany. It is the seat of the like-named Verbandsgemeinde, a kind of collective municipality.

Geography

Location
The town lies in the eastern Hunsrück roughly equidistant from the Moselle, the Rhine and the Nahe. The town centre lies between a depression in the north and the plateau of the Hunsrück, over which runs Bundesstraße 327, the so-called Hunsrückhöhenstraße (“Hunsrück Heights Road”, a scenic road across the Hunsrück built originally as a military road on Hermann Göring’s orders).

Climate
Yearly precipitation in Kastellaun amounts to 755 mm, which falls into the middle third of the precipitation chart for all Germany. At 53% of the German Weather Service's weather stations, lower figures recorded. The driest month is April. The most rainfall comes in June. In that month, precipitation is 1.4 times what it is in April. Precipitation varies only slightly and is spread very evenly throughout the year. Only at 1% of the weather stations are lower seasonal swings recorded.

History
Kestilun was first mentioned in writing in 1226. castle was built by the Counts of Sponheim and belonged until 1417 to the County of Sponheim.

In 1301, the castle and the town became home to Simon II, Count of Sponheim-Kreuznach and his wife Elisabeth. Count Simon granted Kastellaun town rights in 1305 and also secured market rights on 8 November 1309 from Emperor Henry VII, who was the brother of Baldwin of Luxembourg, Archbishop of Trier. In 1321, the castle and the town found themselves under siege from Baldwin, who in 1325 also built another castle at Buch, Burg Balduinseck, to counter Kastellaun's challenges to his authority. In 1340, Count Walram of Sponheim left Kastellaun and went to Bad Kreuznach.

In 1437, the Counts of Sponheim died out, and the inheritance fell with the Amt of Kastellaun to Stephen, Count Palatine of Simmern-Zweibrücken and the Lord of Baden, who ruled it jointly. Frederick I acquired the Principality of Simmern and a share of the County of Sponheim from the Veldenz legacy, which he ruled, after the last Count of Veldenz had died, from Kastellaun. He was therefore the actual founder of the Palatinate-Simmern line. Frederick I and his brother Louis divided their father's holdings between them once again in 1459. Louis got the Duchy of Zweibrücken and Frederick resided in Simmern. The Palatinate-Simmern share of the County of Sponheim passed in 1560 to the Count Palatine Zweibrücken and in 1569 to Palatinate-Birkenfeld under Zweibrücken hegemony.

Living at the castle until 1594 were various bailiffs (Amtmänner) who represented the joint lords’ (the County of Veldenz, the Margraviate of Baden, Palatinate-Simmern and Palatinate-Zweibrücken) interests. Margrave Edward Fortunatus was driven out of Baden-Baden in 1594 and sought refuge at the castle, thereby making it a residence once again. In the course of the Thirty Years' War (1618–1648), the town was occupied by Spaniards, Swedes, Lorrains, Hessians and Frenchmen. Great Plague epidemics raged.

The Sponheim lordship began to come to an end in 1687 as many parts of the Rhine's left bank were being occupied by King Louis XIV's troops in the Nine Years' War (known in Germany as the Pfälzischer Erbfolgekrieg, or War of the Palatine Succession). The main result of the occupation for Kastellaun was the castle's and the town's destruction. In 1776, the joint lordship ended definitively, and the Amt and town of Kastellaun passed to Palatinate-Zweibrücken.

During the French Revolutionary Wars, the region was occupied in 1793 and 1794 by French troops and in 1798 it was assigned to the Department of Rhin-et-Moselle, thereby making it French until the Congress of Vienna in 1815. Then, Kastellaun became part of the Prussian Rhine Province.

In 1820, the castle passed into private ownership. In 1884, the town bought the property and gave the ruin its first renovation.

Since 1946, Kastellaun has been part of the then newly founded state of Rhineland-Palatinate. On 14 September 1969, it was granted town rights once again.

The castle hill and the ruins underwent renovation and restoration once again between 1990 and 1993. In 1999, the first castle house was rebuilt, followed by a second in 2005. On 9 September 2007, a documentation centre was dedicated as the “House of Regional History”.

Politics

Town council
The council is made up of 22 council members, who were elected by proportional representation at the municipal election held on 7 June 2009, and the honorary mayor as chairman.

The municipal election held on 7 June 2009 yielded the following results:

Mayor
Kastellaun's mayor is Christian Keimer.

Coat of arms
The town's arms might be described thus: Sable a fess countercompony gules and argent, in chief two crowns in fess Or.

The arms recall those formerly borne by the Counts of Sponheim, which featured a “chequy” pattern. The two crowns are said to symbolize two of the counts who held sway here. These arms appear on the town seal as early as the 15th century.

In the 1920s, Otto Hupp showed a somewhat different coat of arms for Kastellaun in the Coffee Hag albums, with azure (blue) as the field tincture instead of sable (black), and with 14 squares of alternating tinctures on the fess (horizontal stripe) instead of 12. The composition of charges, however, was otherwise the same as in the arms borne now.

Town partnerships
Kastellaun fosters partnerships with the following places:
 Prémery, Nièvre, France

Culture and sightseeing

Buildings
The following are listed buildings or sites in Rhineland-Palatinate’s Directory of Cultural Monuments:

 Castle Kastellaun ruin (monumental zone) – ruin of the wedge-shaped complex founded in the early 14th century and destroyed in 1689 with upper and lower castle; lodging building with, in places, three-floor-high west wall and the west half of the adjoining rectangular tower, both with arch friezes; rectangular building attested by digs; keep; on the site of the lower castle the Catholic Church
 Evangelical church, Kirchplatz 4 – triple nave, earlier half of the 14th century; tower possibly from the earlier half of the 14th century; quire, 15th century
 Catholic Church of the Holy Cross (Kirche zum Hl. Kreuz), Schloßstraße 17 – Gothic Revival basilica, 1899–1902, architect Eduard Endler, Cologne
 Town fortifications – Parts of walls from the former trapezoidal town fortifications, possibly from the earlier half of the 14th century; preserved, a stretch of wall along the backs of the houses on Burgweg and west of the Evangelical church; at Burgweg 6 a reconstructed gate; parts of a wall in the back parts of Eifelstraße 13 and 15, beside those reconstructed wall with parapet walk; remnants of a tower and a gateway arch near Marktstraße 14; parallel to Marktstraße and below the Evangelical church parts of the moat on the north side
 Bahnhofstraße 17 – two-winged Renaissance Revival building, about 1900
 Bahnhofstraße 23 – villa, pyramidal roof, about 1920
 Bahnhofstraße 38 – stately building with hipped roof with Expressionist portal, marked 1922
 Bahnhofstraße 54 – detached house, partly timber-frame, marked 1921
 Bopparder Straße 11 – building with hipped roof, marked 1808
 Bucher Straße 10 – former parish church (Pfarrkirche Hl. Kreuz); aisleless church, 1728; graveyard: graveyard cross, 1858; two grave crosses, 18th century, three basalt grave crosses, 19th century; five cast-iron grave crosses, Rheinböllen Ironworks, late 19th century; whole complex of buildings
 Burgweg 8 – former Catholic school; Late Classicist slate quarrystone building, shortly before 1845
 Burgweg 10 – timber-frame house, partly solid, plastered, 18th century, timber-frame addition
 Kirchstraße 13/15 – timber-frame house, half-hipped roof, 17th century
 Kirchstraße 17 – broadly seated half-hipped roof, partly timber-frame, plastered, about 1700
 Beside Marktstraße 14 – town wall gateway arch, marked 1747; town wall tower
 Marktstraße 14 – two-winged, three-floor timber-frame house, partly solid and slated, marked 1755, expansion/alterations in the 19th century
 Marktstraße 16 – timber-frame house, plastered, rich stucco, caryatids, about 1890
 Marktstraße 17 – former hotel “Zum Schwanen”; timber-frame house, partly solid, hipped mansard roof, possibly from the 17th century
 Marktstraße 22 – former Scharfensteiner Hof; three-floor timber-frame house, partly solid and slated, hipped mansard roof, marked 1724
 Schloßstraße 5a – timber-frame house, partly solid, mansard roof, possibly from the early 18th century
 Schloßstraße 7 – timber-frame house, partly solid, plastered, mansard roof, early 19th century
 Schloßstraße 10 – former Catholic rectory; building with hipped mansard roof, 18th century
 Schloßstraße 11 – former financial office of the Margraves of Baden and the Dukes of Palatine Zweibrücken; today a Catholic rectory, two-winged timber-frame house, partly solid and slated, about 1700
 Schloßstraße 15 – former tithe barn; one-floor building with hipped mansard roof, 18th century
 Schloßstraße 19 – former Badish Amt winery; building with hipped mansard roof, marked 1670
 Jewish graveyard, Hasselbacher Straße (monumental zone) – founded about 1879, 37 grave steles from 1885 to 1933
 warriors’ memorial 1870/1871, Am Pfingstwald – sandstone obelisk

Sport and leisure
On the town's southeastern outskirts is found an indoor swimming pool with an integrated medical rehabilitation centre, and a sport and fitness area. Right nearby is a miniature golf course.

The Kyrill Path was established in May 2008, after the Kyrill storm laid waste to woodlands in 2007. Along the 800 m-long path leading through 1.5 ha of woodland devastated by the storm, the visitor can get an idea of the destruction wrought by the Kyrill storm and also learn something about the regeneration of new forest. Ten information stations deal in detail with geology, pedology, root development, climate, weather, life in dead wood, the bark beetle’s voraciousness, natural and artificial forest rejuvenation, mechanized wood harvesting and modern forestry.

Near the Kyrill Path, a ropes course and a barefoot path were opened in May 2008.

Along Kastellaun’s southern outskirts, along the old Hunsrückbahn (railway) right-of-way, runs the Schinderhannes-Radweg (cycle path). This begins in Simmern and leads by Kastellaun on the way to Emmelshausen.

Near Kastellaun lies the former Pydna Missile Base, where each year, an open-air electronic music festival called Nature One is held.

Among the many clubs, there is the Kastellaun Gymnastics Club (Turnverein Kastellaun), part of the widely known Kastellaun-Simmern Handball Playing Association (Handballspielgemeinschaft Kastellaun-Simmern).

Economy and infrastructure

Education
Located in Kastellaun are one primary school, an Integrierte Gesamtschule (IGS; a comprehensive school that combines Hauptschule, Realschule and Gymnasium streams) with a gymnasial upper level, the Theodor Heuss School for the Mentally Handicapped/School for the Physically Handicapped and the Kastellaun Free Waldorf School.

Other institutions
The Julius-Reuß-Wohnheim is an institution geared to help people with disabilities. It is among the so-called Schmiedelanstalten (roughly “Swamp Institutions” – named for the wetland area where they were originally found; Julius Reuß was their founder) and is located in a residential neighbourhood between the town centre and the industrial park. It collaborates with the other institutions in town dedicated to care of the handicapped, namely the Theodor Heuss Schools mentioned above along with their special kindergarten for children with mental disabilities, the workshop and the daytime assistance centre at the Rhein-Mosel-Werkstätten (“Rhine-Moselle Workshops”) and the home of the club Betreutes Wohnen Hunsrück e.V. (“Hunsrück Assisted Living”) for those with physical illnesses.

Tourism
The town takes it upon itself to promote tourism. On offer are guided tours through the Old Town and to the castle ruins. The most important buildings and sites and historical events from the castle's and the town's history are described and explained on these tours by expert guides. The small, traditional Bell Leisure Park lies right nearby.

Kastellaun lies on the Deutsche Alleenstraße (Germany's longest themed holiday road, featuring many Alleen – tree-lined avenues).

Bundeswehr post
Kastellaun has been home since 20 March 1964 to a Bundeswehr barracks, which houses Command Support Battalion (Führungsunterstützungsbataillon) 282.

Famous people

Notable people born in the town
Philipp Christoph Reichsritter von Sötern (1567–1652), Archbishop and Elector of Trier
Eberhard Kieser (b. 2. December 1583 in Kastellaun; d. November 1631 in Frankfurt) German engraver and publisher
Arnold Constantin Peter Franz von Lasaulx (b. 14 June 1839; d. 25 January 1886) German mineralogist and petrographer
Heinrich Friedrich Zimmer (1851–1910), Celticist and Indologist; first German professor of Celtic studies
Albrecht Koschorke (b. 1958), literary critic at the University of Konstanz

Other notable people associated with the town
 Simon II, Count of Sponheim-Kreuznach (c. 1270-1336)
 Heinrich Barenbroch (about 1525–1587), Evangelical minister and reformer of the city of Essen
Edward Fortunatus (1565–1600), Regent of the Margraviate of Baden-Baden, died at Castle Kastellaun
Friedrich Back (1801–1879), Evangelical minister, superintendent and Heimatforscher.
Friedrich Hachenberg (1915–1992), forester, from 1951 to 1968 led the Kastellaun forestry office and published several books and papers about the forests around the town
Karl-August von Dahl (b. 1942), Evangelical minister, in the 1980s one of the organizers and one of the most important minds of the movement for peace and against the stationing of US nuclear missiles in the Hunsrück
Jutta Renate von Dahl (b. 1943), Evangelical minister, in 1988 the first awarded the Aachen Peace Prize (Aachener Friedenspreis) for her involvement in the peace movement
Christian W. Schenk (b. 1951), German-Romanian lyricist, essayist, translator and publisher, lives in Kastellaun

Further reading
 Kastellaun in der Geschichte. Herausgegeben von der Familienstiftung Pies-Archiv, der Integrierten Gesamtschule Kastellaun und der Stadt Kastellaun in Verbindung mit dem Forschungszentrum Vorderhunsrück
 Band 1: Christof Pies (Red.): Gemeinsame Erinnerung. Jüdische Überlebende des Nationalsozialismus begegnen Bürgern und Schülern ihrer Heimatstadt. Projektwoche der Gesamtschule Kastellaun „Judentum und Nationalsozialismus“. Staatliche Integrierte Gesamtschule Kastellaun und Stadt Kastellaun, Kastellaun 1989, 220 S.
 Band 2: Eike Pies: Bürgerbücher der Stadt und des Amtes Kastellaun. (1568–1798). Pies, Sprockhövel 1991, 675 S., 
 Band 3: Bernd König et al.: Das Wahrzeichen Kastellauns, seine Burg. Pies und Stadt Kastellaun, Dommershausen und Kastellaun 1994, 207 S.,  oder 
 Band 4: Josef Peil (Zusammenstellung) et al.: Streiflichter. Zeugnisse aus dem Leben der Stadt Kastellaun und ihrer Bewohner. Pies und Stadt Kastellaun, Dommershausen und Kastellaun 1996, 292 S., 
 Band 5: Friedrich Hachenberg: Wald um Kastellaun. Ein Beitrag zur Geschichte des Stadtwaldes. Abschließend bearbeitet durch Franz-Josef Boeder. Pies und Stadt Kastellaun, Dommershausen und Kastellaun 1998, 183 S., 
 Band 6: Michael Frauenberger: Bürgerbücher für das Amt Kastellaun (1568–1798). Band 2: Die lutherischen Pfarreien Alterkülz (mit Michelbach und teilweise Neuerkirch), Bell (mit Hasselbach, Hundheim, Krastel, Leideneck, Spesenroth, Völkenroth und Wohnroth), Gödenroth (mit Heyweiler), Roth (mit Hollnich) und Uhler ab 1701. Pies, Dommershausen 1999, 739 (XIX) S., 
 Band 7: Eric Beres: Auswanderung aus dem Hunsrück 1815 - 1871. Strukturen, Ursachen und Folgen am Beispiel der ehemaligen Bürgermeisterei Kastellaun. [Veränderte Magisterarbeit.] Pies und Stadt Kastellaun, Dommershausen und Kastellaun 2001, 178 S., 
 Band 8: Christof Pies (Red.), Rolf Claus et al.: Augenblicke – von Kestilun nach Kastellaun. Pies, Sprockhövel 2008, 243 S., 
 Hubert Leifeld, Karl Peter Wiemer (Red.): Kastellaun. Burg und Stadt im vorderen Hunsrück. Rheinische Kunststätten (Heft 461). Rheinischer Verein für Denkmalpflege und Landschaftsschutz. Neusser Druckerei und Verlag, Neuss 2001, 39 S., 
 Autorenkollektiv: 25 Jahre Garnisonsstadt Kastellaun. Informationsschrift für Gäste und Soldaten''. Mönch, Koblenz, Bonn und Waldesch 1989, 84 S.

References

External links

 Official webpage 

Rhein-Hunsrück-Kreis